Theo Vennemann genannt Nierfeld (born 27 May 1937 in Oberhausen-Sterkrade) is a German historical linguist known for his controversial theories of a "Vasconic" and an "Atlantic" stratum in European languages, published since the 1990s.

He was professor of Germanic and theoretical linguistics at Ludwig Maximilian University, Munich from  1974 (retired 2005).

Theories

Vennemann's book Europa Vasconica – Europa Semitica (2003) was reviewed in Lingua by linguists Philip Baldi and B. Richard Page, who made reasoned dismissals of a number of his proposals. The reviewers still applauded Vennemann's "efforts to reassess the role and extent of language contact in the development of Indo-European languages in Europe".

Vennemann's controversial claims about the prehistory of European languages include the following:
 Vasconic substratum theory: A "Vasconic" language family ancestral to Basque is a substratum of European languages, especially Germanic, Celtic, and Italic. Vennemann claims this could be evidenced by various loan words, toponyms, and structural features such as word-initial accent.  The linguistic origin of Old European hydronymy, traditionally considered as Indo-European, is classified as Vasconic by Vennemann. Numerous toponyms that are traditionally considered as Indo-European by virtue of their Indo-European head words are instead names that have been adapted to Indo-European languages through the addition of a suffix.
 Semitic is a substratum of the Celtic languages, as shown by certain structural features of Celtic, especially their lack of external possessors.
 Punic, the Semitic language spoken in classical Carthage, is a superstratum of the Germanic languages. According to Vennemann, Carthaginians colonized the North Sea region between the 6th and 3rd centuries BC; this, he claims, is evidenced by proposed Semitic loanwords in the Germanic languages as well as structural features such as strong verbs and similarities between Norse religion and Semitic religion. The theory replaces his older theory of an unknown Semitic substrate language that he called "Atlantidic" or "Semitidic". The Runic alphabet is derived directly from the Phoenician alphabet used by the Carthaginians but without intervention by the Greek alphabet.  The Germanic sound shift is dated to the 6th to 3rd centuries BC, as evidenced by the fact that only some presumed Punic loanwords participated in it.

References

External links
Private site 
Academic site

1937 births
Living people
Linguists from Germany
Paleolinguists
Sterkrade